Kill Her Gently is a 1957 British thriller film directed by Charles Saunders and starring Griffith Jones, Maureen Connell and Marc Lawrence.

Plot
A motorist picks up two convicts who have just escaped from prison. He recognises the men from descriptions given of them on the radio. He hires them to murder his wife. The plan goes wrong, and he and the convicts meet their doom.

Cast
 Griffith Jones - Jeff Martin 
 Maureen Connell - Kay Martin 
 Marc Lawrence - William Connors 
 George Mikell - Lars Svenson 
 Shay Gorman - Doctor Jimmy Landers 
 Marianne Brauns - Raina 
 Frank Hawkins - Inspector Raglan 
 John Gayford - Truck Driver 
 Roger Avon - Constable Brown 
 Patrick Connor - Detective Sgt. Thompson 
 Jonathan Meddings - Bank clerk 
 Peter Stephens - Bank manager 
 Susan Neill - Barmaid 
 David Lawton - Slade 
 Elaine Wells - Mrs Douglas

References

Bibliography
 Chibnall, Steve & McFarlane, Brian. The British 'B' Film. Palgrave MacMillan, 2009.

External links

1957 films
British thriller films
Films directed by Charles Saunders
Films set in England
Columbia Pictures films
1950s thriller films
1950s English-language films
1950s British films